Grevillea formosa, also known as the Mount Brockman grevillea, is a species of flowering plant in the family Proteaceae and is endemic to Arnhem Land in the Northern Territory. It is a prostrate to sprawling shrub with deeply divided leaves, the lobes sometimes further divided, the end leaflets linear, and green flowers that turn bright golden-yellow.

Description
The edges of the leaflets are rolled under, but are not sharply-pointed.

Taxonomy
Grevillea formosa was first formally described in 1986 by Donald McGillivray in his book New Names in Grevillea (Proteaceae), based on specimens collected in 1973. The specific epithet (formosa) means "beautifully-formed".

Distribution and habitat
This grevillea grows in rocky places in the Pine Creek and Arnhem Plateau bioregions of western Arnhem Land.

Conservation status
Grevillea formosa is listed as of "least concern" under the Northern Territory Government Territory Parks and Wildlife Conservation Act.

References

formosa
Proteales of Australia
Plants described in 1986
Taxa named by Donald McGillivray